A Christmas Carol is a 1938 American drama film adaptation of Charles Dickens's 1843 novella of the same name, starring Reginald Owen as Ebenezer Scrooge, an elderly miser who learns the error of his ways on Christmas Eve after visitations by three spirits.

Plot

On Christmas Eve in 19th-century London, Fred is sliding on ice on a sidewalk. He meets Peter and Tim Cratchit, sons of his uncle Ebenezer's clerk, Bob Cratchit. When Fred reveals who he is, the boys take off in terror. Fred soon arrives at the counting-house of his miserly maternal uncle, Ebenezer Scrooge. After declining an invitation from his nephew to dine with him on Christmas, Scrooge rejects two gentlemen collecting money for charity. That night, Scrooge reluctantly allows his employee Bob Cratchit to have Christmas off with pay but orders him back all the earlier the day after. Later Bob accidentally knocks off Scrooge's hat with a snowball. Scrooge dismisses Bob and withholds a week's pay to compensate for his ruined hat, also demanding a shilling to make up the difference.  Bob spends the last of his wages on food for his family's Christmas dinner.

In his house, Scrooge is confronted by the ghost of his deceased business partner, Jacob Marley, who warns Scrooge to repent his wicked ways or he will be condemned in the afterlife as Marley was. He tells Scrooge he will be haunted by three spirits.

At 1 a.m, Scrooge is visited by the youthful Ghost of Christmas Past, who takes him back in time to his early life. Scrooge is shown his unhappiness when he was left to spend the holidays alone at school, and his joy when his sister, Fran, came to take him home for Christmas. The spirit reminds Scrooge that Fran, dead for some years, is the mother of his nephew. Scrooge is shown his early career in business and money lending as an employee under Fezziwig.

At two o'clock, Scrooge meets the merry Ghost of Christmas Present, who shows Scrooge how others keep Christmas. At a church service, Fred and his fiancée, Bess, are seen as happy and in love. The couple must wait to marry because of Fred's financial circumstances, and the spirit observes that perhaps they will not marry at all and their love may end, just as Scrooge lost his fiancée in his youth. Scrooge is then shown the Cratchit home. Despite wearing a cheery manner for his family's sake, Bob is deeply troubled by the loss of his job, though he confides in no one except his daughter Martha. The spirit hints that Bob's youngest son, Tim, will die of a crippling illness by the same time next year if things do not change.

At 3 a.m., the Ghost of Christmas Yet to Come arrives, appearing as a silent, cloaked figure. The spirit shows Scrooge what will happen if he does not change. Scrooge discovers Tiny Tim is dead and his family mourns for him. Scrooge also discovers that his own death will not be mourned. Scrooge promises to repent and returns home to awake in his own bed on Christmas Day.

Scrooge is a changed man. He asks a boy in the street to buy the large turkey in the butcher shop's window for him, meaning to take it to the Cratchits. Running into the two men who petitioned him for charity on Christmas Eve, Scrooge gives them a large donation. He visits Fred and makes him his new partner, then goes to the Cratchit house where he gives everyone gifts and rehires Bob with an increase in his wages.

Cast
 Reginald Owen as Ebenezer Scrooge
 Gene Lockhart as Bob Cratchit
 Kathleen Lockhart as Mrs. Cratchit
 Terry Kilburn as Tiny Tim Cratchit
 Barry MacKay as Fred (Scrooge's nephew)
 Lynne Carver as Bess (Fred's fiancée)
 Bunny Beatty as Martha Cratchit (uncredited)
 June Lockhart as Belinda Cratchit (uncredited)
 John O'Day as Peter Cratchit (uncredited)
 Leo G. Carroll as Marley's Ghost
 Ann Rutherford as Ghost of Christmas Past
 Lionel Braham as Ghost of Christmas Present
 D'Arcy Corrigan as Ghost of Christmas Yet to Come
 Ronald Sinclair as Young Scrooge
 Elvira Stevens as Fran Scrooge (uncredited)
 Forrester Harvey as Old Fezziwig (uncredited)
 Olaf Hytten as Schoolmaster (uncredited)
 Harry Cording as Waiter (uncredited) 
 Halliwell Hobbes as Clergyman (uncredited) 
 Charles Coleman as First Solicitor (uncredited) 
 Matthew Boulton as Second Solicitor (uncredited) 
 John Rogers as Chestnut Vendor (uncredited)
 Cliff Severn as Boy Buying Turkey (uncredited)

Production

Made by Metro-Goldwyn-Mayer, and originally intended to star Lionel Barrymore (who played the role of Scrooge annually on radio but was forced to drop out of the film because of his arthritis, though he narrated its trailer), the movie starred Reginald Owen as Scrooge and the married couple Gene and Kathleen Lockhart as the Cratchits. Terry Kilburn costarred as Tiny Tim and a young June Lockhart (Gene and Kathleen's daughter) made her screen debut as one of the Cratchit daughters. Leo G. Carroll played Marley's Ghost. The characters of Fred (Scrooge's nephew) and Elizabeth, his fiancée (his wife in the novelette), were greatly expanded in order to work in a romantic angle to the story that Dickens did not intend. The couple was played by Barry MacKay and Lynne Carver. Ann Rutherford, better known as Polly Benedict in the MGM Andy Hardy film series and as Carreen O'Hara in Gone with the Wind, was a young and attractive Ghost of Christmas Past, rather than the somewhat unusual creation that Dickens described.

The music for the film was composed by Franz Waxman, in contrast to most MGM films of the period, whose scores were composed by Herbert Stothart.

Some of the grimmer aspects of the story went completely unmentioned or unseen, in order to make this a "family film" in the style of other MGM literary adaptations, and also to accommodate a 69-minute run time. Although Marley's Ghost did appear, the phantoms wailing outside Scrooge's window were not shown. Scrooge's fiancée, who eventually leaves him because of his miserly ways, was completely dropped from the film, as were the two starving children "Want" and "Ignorance", who hid within the folds of the Ghost of Christmas Present's robe. Also gone were the thieves who ransack Scrooge's belongings after he "dies" in the Ghost of Christmas Yet to Come segment. While Gene Lockhart's performance as Bob Cratchit is admired, he is often criticized for looking too "well-fed" for the role. In this production, unlike Dickens' original story, Scrooge actually fires Cratchit rather than just threatening to do so.

One of the changes made in this film that differs from the novel is the arrival of the ghosts. While the first still arrives at 1:00 a.m., the second appears at 2:00 and the third appears at 3:00. In the original novel, the second appears the next night at 1:00 and the last appears the third night when the last stroke of 12:00 has ceased to vibrate. This change was also used in other versions such as Scrooge (1970), Mickey's Christmas Carol (1983), and A Christmas Carol (1984).

Theatrical release
Originally intended as a 1939 release, A Christmas Carol was rushed into production in October 1938 and was finished in a matter of weeks. It opened in December at New York City's Radio City Music Hall where it did moderately well. One of many adaptations of the work, it was frequently revived in theaters by MGM.

Television broadcast
The film was shown on local television stations in the United States throughout the 1960s and 1970s, and was a staple of Chicago's WGN television's Family Classics. It ran in syndication throughout the United States from the 1960s to the 1990s on various local networks until the advent of cable television. Since the late 1990s, it has been broadcast on Turner Classic Movies, airing several times during December.

Home media
In 1988, MGM/UA Home Video and Turner Entertainment released A Christmas Carol on VHS celebrating its 50th anniversary, for the first time in a colorized version. In an interview with The Hollywood Reporter in 1988 promoting the film's release on home video, actress June Lockhart admitted that, despite being an MGM production, it was "a 'B' picture". The colorized version was released once again on VHS by Warner Home Video in 2000. In November 2005, the black and white version was released on DVD in a "Classic Holiday Collection" box set including Boys Town and Christmas in Connecticut, two other MGM titles with a holiday/family theme; it was also released as an individual title. Since its first DVD release, it has seen multiple releases in various Christmas movie collection box sets. A Blu-ray version was released in November 2014.

See also 
 List of Christmas films
 List of ghost films
 List of A Christmas Carol adaptations

References

External links

 
 
 
 
 A Christmas Carol: With Original Illustrations in Full Color Print Edition

1938 films
1930s ghost films
American Christmas drama films
American black-and-white films
1930s English-language films
Films scored by Franz Waxman
Films based on A Christmas Carol
Films directed by Edwin L. Marin
Metro-Goldwyn-Mayer films
Films produced by Joseph L. Mankiewicz
Films set in London
Films set in the 19th century
Films set in the Victorian era
1930s historical drama films
American historical drama films
1930s Christmas drama films
1938 drama films
1930s American films